Avengers Social Club is a 2017 South Korean television series starring Lee Yo-won, Ra Mi-ran, Myung Se-bin and Lee Jun-young. It is adapted from a webtoon titled Buam-dong Avengers Social Club which was serialized on Daum from 2014 to 2016. It airs every Wednesday and Thursday starting October 11, 2017 on cable channel tvN.

Synopsis
Features three women and one man from different walks of life coming together for revenge: a fish store ajumma who envisioned a better life for herself, a housewife who grew up an orphan, a chaebol magnate's daughter who was raised like a delicate flower and a young man who was neglected by his parents. They're an unlikely foursome who would never otherwise meet, but they join forces to carry out their individual revenges. Although they start out as co-conspirators, along the way they become close to one another.

Cast

Main
 Lee Yo-won as Kim Jung-hye
Daughter of a family who runs a big company. She appears straightforward and arrogant, but she is actually naive and cute. Her marriage was made to benefit both families. She tries her best as a wife, but she learns that her husband has betrayed her. To get revenge, she leads the "Bok-ja Club".
 Ra Mi-ran as Hong Do-hee
Hong Do-hee sells fish at a traditional market and raises her two kids alone. Her husband died. She is bright and good natured. Her son gets involved in a violent incident at school.
 Myung Se-bin as Lee Mi-sook 
She was an orphan and married. She has tried hard to have a happy family with her university professor husband, but he is violent towards her. She had a son and daughter, but her son Seo-jin died prior to the events of the drama, and her daughter Seo-yeon became estranged from her since. She begins to think about her life after she meets Kim Jung-hye and Hong Do-hee.
 Lee Jun-young as Lee Soo-gyum
He joins the "Bok-ja Club" to take revenge on his biological parents. His father is Kim Jung-hye's husband. Before he married Kim Jung-hye, he had a fling with a woman who gave birth to Lee Soo-gyum. His biological parents have neglected him since.

Supporting
Jung-hye's family
 Choi Byung-mo as Lee Byung-soo (husband)
 Jang Yong as Lee Jae-gook (father-in-law)
 Jung Ae-yun as Kim Jung-yoon (sister)

Do-hee's family
 Yoon Jin-sol as Kim Hee-kyung (daughter)
 Choi Kyu-jin as Kim Hee-soo (son)

Mi-sook's family
 Jung Suk-yong as Baek Young-pyo (husband)
 Kim Bo-ra as Baek Seo-yeon (daughter)
 Sung Byung-sook as mother-in-law

Soo-gyum's family
 Shin Dong-mi as Han Soo-ji (mother)

Others
 Shin Dong-woo as Hwang Jung-wook
 Yoo In-soo as Kyung-bok	
 Jung Young-joo as Joo Gil-yun (Jung-wook's mother)
 Kim Hyung-il as Hong Sang-man, Principal of Buam-dong High School
 Kim Sa-kwon as Park Seung-woo
 So Hee-jung
 Jo Ah-in

Special appearance
 Jo Hee-bong as café's angry customer (ep. 2)

Production
First script reading took place on August 17, 2017 at Studio Dragon in Sangam-dong, Seoul.

Ratings
In this table,  represent the lowest ratings and  represent the highest ratings.

Awards and nominations

References

External links
  
 Avengers Social Club at Studio Dragon 
 Avengers Social Club at JS Pictures 
 
 
 Buam-dong Boksuja Social Club at Kakao Webtoon 

Korean-language television shows
2017 South Korean television series debuts
2017 South Korean television series endings
TVN (South Korean TV channel) television dramas
Television series by Studio Dragon
South Korean comedy-drama television series
Television shows based on South Korean webtoons
Television series by JS Pictures